Rani Dhanya Kumari College, (Bengali: রানী ধন্যকুমারী কলেজ) established in 1962, is a general degree college of Jiaganj in Murshidabad district. It offers undergraduate courses in arts and commerce. It is affiliated to University of Kalyani.

History 
Some notable personalities and educationists of Jiaganj along with the founder Principal of Jiaganj College of Commerce Late J.R. Sengupta, established the college on 1 August 1962. The college started its functioning in the evening shift in the premises of the neighbouring Sripat Singh College.

In 1973, the college was shifted to a different premise. Calcutta University issued affiliation of the Honours courses. The college then started as a 'Day College' and it was renamed as Rani Dhanya Kumari College of Commerce in the name of Rani Dhanya Kumari, the wife of Landlord of Jiaganj, Sripat Singh Dugar.

Departments

Arts and Commerce
Bengali
English
Sanskrit
History
Geography
Political Science
Sociology
Philosophy
Economics
Commerce
Education

Accreditation
In 2016 the college has been awarded B grade the National Assessment and Accreditation Council (NAAC).The college is recognized by the University Grants Commission (UGC).

See also

References

External links
Official Website
University of Kalyani
University Grants Commission
National Assessment and Accreditation Council

Universities and colleges in Murshidabad district
Colleges affiliated to University of Kalyani
Educational institutions established in 1962
1962 establishments in West Bengal